Ma Xiaolei (Chinese: 马晓磊; Pinyin: Mǎ Xiǎolěi; born 19 January 1987 in Beijing)  is a Chinese football player who currently plays for China League One side Sichuan Jiuniu, on loan from Chengdu Better City.

Club career
Ma Xiaolei was promoted to Chinese Super League side Shenzhen FC in 2006. On 1 September 2007, he made his senior debut in a 4–1 away defeat against Shanghai Shenhua. He scored his first goal four days later, which ensured Shenzhen beat Henan Construction 2–0. Ma moved to China League One side Anhui Jiufang in 2010. He became the player of Tianjin Runyulong in the 2011 season after Anhui jiufang was taken over by Tianjin Runyulong. Ma was loaned to Lithuanian A Lyga side FK Sūduva in February 2011. Ma returned to China in June 2011 and signed a contract with China League Two club Chongqing FC. After three seasons at Chongqing, Ma moved to League Two side Meizhou Kejia in February 2014. In January 2015, Ma transferred to Chinese Super League side Changchun Yatai. He made his debut on 8 March 2015, in a 2–0 league defeat against Shandong Luneng Taishan. He was sent off in the match.

In July 2016, Ma signed for China League Two side Shenzhen Renren. After two seasons within the third tier he joined fourth tier club Chengdu Better City. At Chengdu he would establish himself as a regular within the team that saw them win promotion into the third division. In the 2019 league campaign he would play a vital part in the clubs meteoric rise throughout the divisions by gaining another promotion.

Career statistics
.

References

External links
 

1987 births
Living people
Chinese footballers
Footballers from Beijing
Association football midfielders
Chinese Super League players
China League One players
China League Two players
A Lyga players
Shenzhen F.C. players
Anhui Jiufang players
FK Sūduva Marijampolė players
Meizhou Hakka F.C. players
Changchun Yatai F.C. players
Chengdu Better City F.C. players
Chinese expatriate footballers
Expatriate footballers in Lithuania
Chinese expatriate sportspeople in Lithuania